Assyrian Americans refers to individuals of ethnic Assyrian ancestry born in or residing within the United States of America. Assyrians are an indigenous Middle-Eastern ethnic group native to Mesopotamia in West Asia who descend from their ancient counterparts, directly originating from the ancient indigenous Mesopotamians of Akkad and Sumer who first developed the independent civilisation in northern Mesopotamia that would become Assyria in 2600BCE. Modern Assyrians often culturally self-identify as Syriacs, Chaldeans, or Arameans for religious and tribal identification. The first significant wave of Assyrian immigration to the United States was due to the Sayfo genocide in the Assyrian homeland in 1914-1924.

The largest Assyrian diaspora is located in Metro Detroit, with a figure of 150,000. High concentrations are also located in Phoenix, San Jose, Modesto, San Diego, Los Angeles, Turlock, and Chicago among others.

History

Early history
Assyrians have been present in the United States since the late 19th century. The first recorded Assyrian in America was Zia Attala. He reportedly immigrated to Philadelphia in 1889 and found work in the hotel industry. Most early Assyrian immigrants, however, were young men sent by Western missionaries for religious training.

Second wave of immigration
Following the turn of the century, Assyrian immigration to America mostly came to a halt due to the Immigration Act of 1924, which effectively cut off any legal immigration to the United States for Assyrians and other non-Western European groups. The second large wave of immigration occurred in the 1960s and 70s, mainly from northern Iraq due to conflicts and persecution by the Ba’athist government of Iraq. Others arrived from Iran following the Iranian Revolution. Many Assyrians arrived during this period and took advantage of the ongoing White flight in Detroit.

As a result of the situation, Assyrians gained a monopoly over grocery stores and other small businesses, and in many cases used their finances and newfound wealth to benefit the Assyrian community there and take in Assyrian refugees from Iraq. More Assyrians arrived throughout the 80s and 90s for similar reasons, with newer residents moving out of Detroit into suburbs such as Royal Oak and Sterling Heights due to the crack epidemic in Detroit, while others began to move to San Diego, establishing a new Assyrian community there.

In 2005, the first Assyrian school in the United States, the Assyrian American Christian School, opened in Tarzana, Los Angeles.

In Michigan

Assyrian immigration to cities in Michigan began in the early 20th century. The cities in the state include, but are not limited to, Detroit, Southfield, Sterling Heights, Oak Park, Troy, West Bloomfield, Walled Lake, Rochester Hills, Farmington Hills, Ferndale, Warren, Bloomfield Hills and Ann Arbor. More and more Assyrians, as they establish themselves financially, quickly move out of Detroit and into the other locations, including San Diego and cities in Arizona.

Before the 1970s, Assyrians came to the United States in search of greater economic opportunities. After the 1970s, many Assyrians fled for political freedom, especially after the rise of Saddam Hussein and after the Gulf War. Some were drawn by the economic opportunities they had seen successfully affect their family members who had already immigrated.

Less stringent immigration laws during the 1960s and 1970s facilitated increasing numbers, with the 1970s seeing the highest number of Assyrians coming to the United States. In 1962, the number of Assyrian owned grocery stores was 120, but grew to 278 in 1972. The main cause of this were the 1967 Detroit riots, after which Jewish grocery store owners left the area and left the opportunity open for Assyrians to take over.  Often these Jews sold their old stores to Assyrians.

Iraqi president Saddam Hussein donated hundreds of thousands of dollars to Chaldean Catholic Churches in Detroit and received a key to the city in the 1980s on behalf of mayor Coleman Young, when the Ba’ath regime was an ally of the United States government.

Mostly all new Chaldean Catholic Assyrian immigrants and low-income senior citizens tend to reside in Detroit, in the 7 Mile Road between Woodward Avenue and John R Street. This area was officially named Chaldean Town in 1999. There are eight Chaldean Catholic Churches in Metro Detroit, located in West Bloomfield, Troy (where there are two), Oak Park, Southfield, Warren, Sterling Heights and Detroit.

In California
After World War II, several Assyrian men who had been educated in Iraq by American Jesuits traveled to the United States. They were to teach Arabic to U.S. officers at the Army Language School who were going to be stationed in the Middle East. The men started the San Diego-area Chaldean Catholic community. Yasmeen S. Hanoosh, author of The Politics of Minority Chaldeans Between Iraq and America, wrote that the Chaldean Catholic Church in San Diego "continued to grow in relative isolation from the family-chain-migration based communities in and around Michigan."

In Illinois

Rev. Peter Elia from Iran was the first priest of the Chaldean Catholic community in Chicago which originated in 1907. In 1912, the St. Ephrem Chaldean Parish of Chicago was formed by Rev. Warda Mirza, also from Iran.

Geographic distribution
 
According to the 2011 American Community Survey 1-Year Estimates there are 110,807 Assyrian people in the United States.

The 2000 U.S. Census counted 82,355 Assyrians (including those who identify as Chaldean or Syriac) in the country, of whom most lived in Illinois. These 3 groups were listed as one category in the United States Census

Michigan
There were 34,484 living in Michigan according to the 2000 United States census.
Sterling Heights: 5,515
West Bloomfield: 4,874
Southfield: 3,684
Warren: 2,625
Farmington Hills 2,499
Troy: 2,047
Detroit 1,963
Oak Park 1,864
Madison Heights: 1,428
Bloomfield 513
Hazel Park: 512
Shelby Township: 493
Clinton Township: 225

California
There were 22,671 living in California according to the 2000 United States census.

The state's largest Assyrian American communities are in the San Diego area.
Bostonia
El Cajon
Jamul
La Mesa
Santee
Elsewhere in the Central Valley and San Francisco Bay area: known for its several Assyrian Church of the East, Chaldean Catholic and Syriac Orthodox churches; Oakland and East Bay suburbs; and Santa Clara County such as San Jose.
Turlock
Modesto
Felton
Ceres
Sacramento
Stanislaus County, California
Merced County
Fresno, California area.
Kern County
Santa Maria
Other parts of Southern California, i.e. the Los Angeles area.
Orange County
Inland Empire, California (Riverside-San Bernardino counties)

Illinois
There were 15,685 Assyrians living in Illinois according to the 2000 United States census.

Chicago: 7,121
Niles: 3,410
Skokie
Lincolnwood
Morton Grove
Maine Park: 1,035

Assyrian, Syrian, Syriac
The Federal government of the United States took the word Syrian to mean Arabs from the Syrian Arab Republic and not as one of the terms to identify the ethnically distinct Assyrians, although the terms Syrian and Syriac are strongly accepted by mainstream majority academic opinion to be etymologically, historically, geographically and ethnically derivative of the earlier term Assyrian, and historically meant Assyrian (see Etymology of Syria) and 'not' Arab or Aramean. In addition, the Syrian Arab Republic is home to many ethnicities, including Arabs, Assyrians, Armenians, Kurds and Turkmens, and is thus not an exclusively Arab nation.

The Syriac Orthodox Church was previously known as the Syrian Orthodox Church until a Holy Synod in 2000 voted to change it to Syriac, thus distinguishing from the Arabs. Mor Cyril Aphrem Karim wrote a letter to the Syriacs in 2000 urging them to register in the census as Syriac with a C, and not Syrian with an N to distinguish the group. He also urged them not to register as the country of origin. The Church was previously known as the Assyrian Orthodox Church in America and Israel-Palestine, which can be seen in the name of the Syriac Orthodox Church of Paramus, New Jersey.

Chaldean refers to ethnic Assyrians who are (traditionally) Eastern Catholic, having split from the Assyrian Church in Upper Mesopotamia between the 17th and 19th centuries (see Schism of 1552). Chaldean is thus a religious term, not an ethnic term. The majority of Chaldean Catholics come from Iraq’s Nineveh Plains region, which is located in Upper Mesopotamia (northern Iraq). The Chaldeans of antiquity lived in southeast Mesopotamia from the 9th century BC and disappeared from history in the 6th century BC.

On the US census, there is a section for the Assyrian/Chaldean/Syriacs, which is listed separately from Syrian, Syrian being a subcategory for Arab.

Notable people

 Brian Awadis (FaZe Rug), YouTuber 
 Andre Agassi, Armenian-Assyrian Tennis player
 Terrence Malick, film director, screenwriter and producer
 Adam Benjamin Jr., former politician and a United States Representative from Indiana's 1st congressional district
 Rosie Malek-Yonan, actress, author, director, public figure and activist
 Anna Eshoo, U.S. Representative for California's 18th congressional district
 Victor Kamber, labor union activist and political consultant in the United States
 Vincent Oshana, actor and comedian
 Narsai David, author, radio and television personality in the Bay Area
 Raad Ghantous, half-Assyrian, half-Lebanese Interior designer
 Scott Rumana, Assyrian-American Republican Party politician
 Yasmine Hanani, Assyrian American actress
 Jumana Hanna, imprisoned at the facility known as Al Kelab Al Sayba, or Loose Dogs, during the rule of Saddam Hussein
 Reine Hanna, director of the Assyrian Policy Institute
 Diane Pathieu, television anchor
 Larsa Pippen, reality television personality
 Janan Sawa, Assyrian musician
 Timz, Assyrian-American rapper
 Justin Meram, footballer
 Sargon Dadesho, campaigner, nationalist
 Michael Shabaz, Assyrian-American tennis player
 Beneil Dariush, Assyrian-American professional mixed martial artist
 Daniel Alaei, professional poker player
 John Batchelor, American author and host of The John Batchelor Show radio news magazine
 Bob Miner, former American businessman, co-founder of Oracle Corporation and the producer of Oracle's relational database management system.
 John Joseph (historian), Assyrian-American educator and historian
 Steven Beitashour, international soccer player
 John Nimrod, U.S. politician
 Atour Sargon, Assyrian activist and politician
 Andrew David Urshan, evangelist and author

 Juliana Taimoorazy, activist, founder and current president of the Iraqi Christian Relief Council
 Jacob David, pastor and relief worker

See also

 Arab Americans
 Armenian Americans
 Bulgarian Americans
 Greek Americans
 Lebanese Americans
 Mandaean Americans
 Serbian Americans
 Syrian Americans
 Turkish Americans

References

Further reading
 Hanoosh, Yasmeen H. The Politics of Minority Chaldeans Between Iraq and America. ProQuest, 2008. , 9780549984757.
 Henrich, Natalie and Joseph Henrich. Why Humans Cooperate : A Cultural and Evolutionary Explanation: A Cultural and Evolutionary Explanation. Oxford University Press, 30 May 2007. , 9780198041177.
 Sengstock, Mary C., and Sanaa Taha Al Harahsheh. "Chaldean Americans." Gale Encyclopedia of Multicultural America, edited by Thomas Riggs, (3rd ed., vol. 1, Gale, 2014), pp. 441–452. online
 Sengstock, Mary C. Chaldean-Americans: Changing Conceptions of Ethnic Identity (Center for Migration Studies, 1999).
 Sengstock, Mary C. Chaldeans in Michigan (Michigan State University Press, 2005).

External links
 Chaldean Cultural Center
Assyrian-Americans
Assyrian-Americans reach out to relatives displaced by Iraq war

Ethnic groups in the United States
 
Assyrian diaspora in North America
Middle Eastern American